Matthew Thomas Warburton (born 24 May 1992) is an English professional footballer who plays as an attacking midfielder for  side FC Halifax Town.

Career
After playing for Maine Road, Curzon Ashton, Salford City and Stockport County, in May 2019 it was announced that Warburton has signed a two-year contract with Northampton Town, starting in July 2019. Before joining Northampton, Warburton worked as a PE teacher at Ashton-on-Mersey School in Sale, Greater Manchester. On 3 August 2019, he made his professional debut in a 1–0 defeat against Walsall.

On 8 October 2020, Warburton signed for National League side Yeovil Town on loan until the end of the 2020–21 season.

On 11 May 2021 it was announced that he would leave Northampton when his contract expired at the end of the season.

On 1 August 2021, Warburton was announced to have signed for National League side F.C. Halifax Town on a free transfer. He scored his first goal for the club in their 3–0 National League win over Stockport County. He was awarded the National League Player of the Month award for December 2021 after three goals across the month.

Career statistics

Honours
Northampton Town
 EFL League Two play-offs: 2020

Individual
National League: December 2021

References

1992 births
Living people
English footballers
Schoolteachers from Greater Manchester
Curzon Ashton F.C. players
Salford City F.C. players
Stockport County F.C. players
Northampton Town F.C. players
Yeovil Town F.C. players
FC Halifax Town players
Association football forwards
English Football League players
National League (English football) players
Northern Premier League players
North West Counties Football League players
Maine Road F.C. players